Jean-Claude Viry (15 August 1943 – 20 April 2011) was a French biathlete. He competed at the 1968 Winter Olympics and the 1976 Winter Olympics.

References

1943 births
2011 deaths
French male biathletes
Olympic biathletes of France
Biathletes at the 1968 Winter Olympics
Biathletes at the 1976 Winter Olympics
Sportspeople from Vosges (department)